The liberation of the apostle Peter is an event described in the Acts of the Apostles, chapter 12 in which the apostle Peter is rescued from prison by an angel. Although described in a short textual passage, the tale has given rise to theological discussions and has been the subject of a number of artworks.

Biblical narrative

 says that Peter was put into prison by King Herod, but the night before his trial an angel appeared to him, and told him to leave. Peter's chains fell off, and he followed the angel out of prison, thinking it was a vision (verse 9). The prison doors opened of their own accord, and the angel led Peter into the city.

When the angel suddenly left him, Peter came to himself and returned to the house of Mary, the mother of John Mark. A servant girl called Rhoda came to answer the door, and when she heard Peter's voice she was so overjoyed that she rushed to tell the others, and forgot to open the door for Peter (verse 14). Eventually Peter is let in and describes "how the Lord had brought him out of prison" (verse 17). When his escape is discovered, Herod orders the guards put to death.

Theological significance
F. F. Bruce argues that "direct divine intervention is strongly indicated" in this narrative. He contrasts the story of Peter to that of James the Great, who was reported in verse 2 as having been executed by Herod, and notes that why "James should die while Peter should escape" is a "mystery of divine providence."

James B. Jordan suggests that this incident is portrayed as being a type of resurrection for Peter. Noting that one of the major themes of the Book of Acts is that "Christ's servants follow in His footsteps," Jordan argues that the events of the chapter "recapitulate the resurrection of Jesus." Amy-Jill Levine and Marianne Blickenstaff, like Jordan, relate the disbelief of Rhoda's message to Luke 24:1–12, where most of the disciples refuse to believe the news of the resurrection brought by a group of women.

Depiction in art

The following artists have depicted this event:
 Antonio de Bellis, The Liberation of St. Peter
 Battistello Caracciolo, Liberation of St. Peter
 Jacopo di Cione, Apostle Peter Released from Prison
 Giovanni Ghisolfi, Saint Peter freed from prison
 Giovanni Lanfranco, Liberation of Saint Peter
 Gerrit van Honthorst, St. Peter Released from Prison
 Bartolomé Esteban Murillo, Liberation of St. Peter
 Filippo Lippi, Liberation of St. Peter (fresco in Brancacci Chapel)
 Pier Francesco Mola, St. Peter Freed from Prison
 Raphael, Deliverance of Saint Peter
 Sebastiano Ricci, Liberation of St. Peter by an angel
 Bernardo Strozzi, The Release of St. Peter
 Jusepe de Ribera painted the scene twice:
 The Deliverance of St. Peter (1639) is in the Museo del Prado
 The Deliverance of St. Peter from Prison (1642) is in the Gemäldegalerie Alte Meister.

Veneration 

A number of churches are named after "St Peter in Chains" (Latin St Peter ad Vincula, Italian San Pietro in Vincoli), including in Rome (which claims to house the very chains that fell from Peter's hands), in Pisa, in London, Birżebbuġa (Malta), Tollard Royal (UK) and in Cincinnati.

The relic of the Chains of St. Peter were kept in Jerusalem, where they were venerated by Christian pilgrims. In the fourth century, the Patriarch of Jerusalem, St. Juvenal, presented them to Eudocia, wife of Emperor Theodosius the Younger, and she took them to Constantinople.

Later, Eudocia sent a portion of the chains to Rome with her daughter Licinia Eudoxia, the wife of Valentinian III. Licinia Eudoxia built the church of S. Petrus ad Vincula on the Esquiline Hill to house the relic. Also in Rome was the relic of the chains with which Peter was bound when he was imprisoned by Nero. These latter chains were placed in the same church as the chains from Jerusalem.

Festivals
The traditional festival of "St Peter in Chains" was on 1 August, and had the collect:
O God, who didst deliver thy holy Apostle Saint Peter from his bonds and suffer him to depart unhurt:vouchsafe, we pray thee; to deliver us from the bonds of our sins, and of thy mercy preserve us from all evil.
It was included in the pre-1962 General Calendar of the Roman Rite (see the Tridentine Calendar, the General Roman Calendar as in 1954 and the General Roman Calendar of Pope Pius XII). Traditional Roman Catholics continue to celebrate the feast day of "St Peter's Chains" either as a Greater-Double or a Double Major feast. In the Orthodox Church this feast is celebrated on January 16.

Other references 
Acts 12:7 is referred to in Charles Wesley's hymn And Can It Be:
Long my imprisoned spirit lay,
Fast bound in sin and nature's night;
Thine eye diffused a quickening ray;
I woke, the dungeon flamed with light;
My chains fell off, my heart was free,
I rose, went forth, and followed thee.

Further reading

Notes

External links
 "St. Peter ad Vincula, or St. Peter’s Chains", Butler's Lives of the Saints

Angelic apparitions in the Bible
Saint Peter
Acts of the Apostles